The Scottish Music Awards are an annual award ceremony held in Scotland to commemorate outstanding musical contribution by musicians over the past year to Scottish music and success on the Scottish Singles and Albums Charts.  As of 2020, the awards have been held annually for 22 years.

The 2020 ceremony was held on 28 November, dubbed as a "St. Andrew's Day celebration". Performances included Lewis Capaldi, Biffy Clyro, Texas, Amy Macdonald, Wet Wet Wet, Dougie MacLean, GUN, Stephanie Cheape, HYYTS, kitti, Luke La Volpe, George Bowie and Graeme Park.

History

Over the course of the awards tenure, the awards have honoured some of the Scotland's biggest international musicians, including Annie Lennox and Susan Boyle, whilst celebrating Scotland’s best up and coming musical artists, through breakthrough awards awarded to musicians Be Charlotte, Tom Walker and Lewis Capaldi.

The award ceremonies aim to raise funds for the UK’s largest independent music therapy charity, Nordoff Robbins.

Ceremonies

2021

The event was held on Saturday 13 November 2021 in Barrowland Ballroom in Glasgow, marking the first time in the events history that it has been held at the venue. The event was once again hosted by Edith Bowman, and marked the live return for the event following the virtual ceremony that took place in 2020 due to the Covid-19 pandemic in Scotland.

Winners

The winners in the following categories are listed below:

 Specsavers Outstanding Achievement Award - Amy Macdonald
 Sir Reo Stakis Legends Award - The Bluebells
 Pizza Express Best Pop Act - Bow Anderson
 Best Female Breakthrough (sponsored by Tennent’s Light) - Brooke Combe
 King Tut’s Wah Wah Hut Songwriting Award - The Fratellis
 Best Male Breakthrough (sponsored by Dirt Comms and KHOLE) - Nathan Evans
 Women in Music Award (sponsored by ROX – Diamonds & Thrills) - Nina Nesbitt 
 Best UK Award (sponsored by SWG3) - Sam Fender
 guitarguitar Best Album - The Snuts
 OVO Energy Eco Award - KT Tunstall
 Raymond Weil Icon Award - Wet Wet Wet
 Ticketmaster Best Live Award - Biffy Clyro

Performances

Performances were part of the event and featured performances from artists including: 

 The Bluebells
 Brooke Combe
 The Fratellis
 Nathan Evans
 Nina Nesbitt

2020
The 2020 ceremony was hosted by Edith Bowman in the west end of Glasgow. The event was held virtually due to COVID-19 restrictions.

Nominations

 Ambassadors of Rock Award sponsored by Hard Rock Cafe – Gun
 Best Album Award sponsored by Guitar Guitar - Biffy Clyro
 Best Breakthrough Award sponsored by Notion Magazine - Luke La Volpe (Male) and kitti (Female)
 Best Pop Act Award sponsored by Bose – HYYTS
 Best UK Award sponsored by SSE – Lewis Capaldi
 Icons Award sponsored by Raymond Weil – Texas
 Innovation Award sponsored by SSE - Graeme Park - Hacienda Classics
 Nordoff Robbins Legend Award - George Bowie
 Outstanding Contribution Award sponsored by Specsavers - Wet Wet Wet
 Special Recognition Award sponsored by Sir Reo Stakis
 Foundation – Dougie MacLean
 Women in Music Award sponsored by Rox - Amy Macdonald

2019

Nominations

The 2019 nominations for the award ceremony were:

 Scottish Music Award - Liam Gallagher
 Barrowlands Best Album Award - Tom Walker
 Outstanding Contribution to Music Award - Simple Minds
 Best Breakthrough Artist - Joesef 
 Best Rock Band - Twin Atlantic
 Songwriting Award - Lewis Capaldi
 Electronic Music Award - Auntie Flo 
 Evolution Award - Be Charlotte

2018

Nominations

The nominations for the 2018 ceremony were:

 Susan Boyle: Scottish Music Hall of Fame Award sponsored by The Royal Highland Centre
 Éclair Fifi: Electronic Music Award sponsored by Sub Club
 Kyle Falconer: Best Album Award sponsored by Hard Rock Cafe
 SWG3: Evolution Award sponsored by The Sunday Mail
 The Snuts: Breakthrough Artist Award sponsored by Rekorderlig
 Annie Lennox: Scottish Music Hall of Fame Award sponsored by The Royal Highland Centre
 Snow Patrol: Artist of the Year Award sponsored by SSE
 Mark Knopfler: Living Legend Award sponsored by Raymond Weil
 World Pipe Band Championships: Glasgow UNESCO City of Music, Best Live Event Award
 Kevin Bridges: Ticketmaster Tourmaster Award
 Gary Clark: Music Business Award sponsored by The Sir Reo Stakis Foundation
 Frightened Rabbit: The King Tut's Wah Wah Hut Songwriting Award
 The Script: Best International Artist Award sponsored by Specsavers
 Tom Grennan: Best UK Artist Award sponsored by ROX – Diamonds and Thrills

2017

Nominations

The winners of the 2017 ceremony were:

 ‘Song Writing Award’ Sponsored by King Tut's Wah Wah Hut – Emeli Sandé
 ‘Best Rock Band Award’ Sponsored by Hard Rock Heals  - The Temperance Movement
 ‘Electronic Music Award’ Sponsored by Sub Club - Denis Sulta
 ‘Exceptional Contribution’ Sponsored by Sub Club – SLAM
 'Best Breakthrough Artist Award’ Sponsored by Jack Daniel's - Lewis Capaldi
 Scottish Music Hall of Fame Award’ Sponsored by The Royal Highland Centre - Ian Stewart
 ‘Music Ambassador Award’ Sponsored by Sir Reo Stakis Foundation - Horse McDonald
 Unesco City of Music Best Live Event Award – Regular Summer of Nights
 Ticketmaster Tourmaster Award - Texas
 ‘Evolution Award’ Sponsored by Coors Light - Nina Nesbitt
 ‘Music Business Award’ Sponsored by Sunday Mail - Glasgow Jazz Festival
 ‘Best UK Newcomer’ Sponsored by Hampden Cars - Tom Walker
 ‘Best International Artist Award’ Sponsored by Chisholm Hunter - Alice Cooper
 ‘Outstanding Contribution to Music’ Sponsored by SSE - The Waterboys

See also

 Music of Scotland

References

European music awards
Scottish music
1999 establishments in Scotland
Awards established in 1999